Thomas Shimada (born February 10, 1975) is a retired professional tennis player who represented Japan. He turned professional in 1993.

Shimada primarily played doubles. Shimada has achieved a career-high singles ranking relevant as of March 23, 2007, of world No. 477 which he reached on November 3, 1997. Also relevant of March 23, 2007, Shimada reached his career-high doubles ranking on September 24, 2001, when he became world No. 40.

Career finals

Doubles: 6 (3–3)

External links
 
 
 

1975 births
Living people
Japanese male tennis players
Japanese people of American descent
Japanese-American tennis players
People from Hilton Head, South Carolina
Tennis players from Philadelphia
Tennis people from South Carolina
Tennis players at the 2000 Summer Olympics
American sportspeople of Japanese descent
Tennis players at the 2002 Asian Games
Asian Games medalists in tennis
Medalists at the 2002 Asian Games
Asian Games gold medalists for Japan
Olympic tennis players of Japan